Baldwinowice  (German Belmsdorf) is a village in the administrative district of Gmina Namysłów, within Namysłów County, Opole Voivodeship, in south-western Poland.

See also
Holy Trinity Church, Baldwinowice

References

Baldwinowice